Chahchaheh is a village in Pasakuh Rural District, Zavin District, Kalat County, Razavi Khorasan Province, Iran. At the 2006 census, its population was 584, in 126 families.  The village is located on the border with Turkmenistan, 9.8 miles from Akhchadepe across the border.

References

External links

Populated places in Kalat County